Trevor John Wood (born July 31, 1953) is an English-American special effects artist. He won an Academy Award and was nominated for one more in the category Best Visual Effects for the films The Golden Compass and Prometheus.

 Selected filmography 
 The Golden Compass (2007; co-won with Michael L. Fink, Bill Westenhofer and Ben Morris)
 Prometheus'' (2012; co-nominated with Richard Stammers, Charley Henley and Martin Hill)

References

External links 

1953 births
Living people
People from Eton, Berkshire
English emigrants to the United States
Special effects people
Best Visual Effects Academy Award winners